WYAM may refer to:

 WYAM (AM), a radio station (890 AM) licensed to Hartselle, Alabama, United States
 WYAM-LD, a low-power television station (channel 28, virtual 51) licensed to Priceville, Alabama, United States
 Wyam is a Chinookan and Sahaptian name for Celilo Falls
 Celilo Falls, a tribal fishing area on the border between the U.S. states of Oregon and Washington
 Celilo Village, Oregon, an unincorporated Native American community in Wasco County, Oregon, United States